Albert E. Rice (September 24, 1845 – September 11, 1921) was an American banker, newspaperman, legislator, University of Minnesota regent, politician and the tenth Lieutenant Governor of Minnesota from Willmar. He served as a Republican from January 4, 1887, to January 5, 1891, under Governors Andrew Ryan McGill and William Rush Merriam.

He was in the Minnesota Senate for several terms, representing District 40 from 1874 to 1875, and again from 1878 to 1882, and District 36 from 1883 to 1886.

Rice gives his name to Rice Memorial Hospital in Willmar, a level 3 trauma center and the largest municipally-owned hospital in Minnesota.

The Rice Mansion, Rice's former home, is located on the northern shore of Green Lake in Spicer and is a local landmark.

References

Minnesota Historical Society
Minnesota Legislators Past and Present

Lieutenant Governors of Minnesota
1921 deaths
1845 births
Republican Party Minnesota state senators
People from Willmar, Minnesota